Neo-Nazi music may refer to:
Rock Against Communism
Nazi punk
National Socialist black metal
Fashwave